HMS Mayfly may refer to two vessels of the British Royal Navy named after the mayfly:

 Mayfly, a torpedo boat launched in January 1907, having been named  whilst under construction; sunk by a naval mine in March 1916
 , a  river gunboat constructed in sections at Yarrow in 1915; lent to the War Department in January 1918; sold at Basra in March 1923

See also
 HMA No. 1 - first RN airship also known as "Mayfly"

References
 

Royal Navy ship names